Oregon Experiment may refer to 

 Oregon Medicaid health experiment, a study of Medicaid
 The Oregon Experiment, a book about campus community planning